is a Japanese gambling manga series written by Fūmei Sai and illustrated by Yasushi Hoshino. It was serialized in Weekly Shōnen Magazine from July 1997 to December 2004. It was adapted by Toei Animation into a 20-episode anime television series, broadcast on TV Asahi from October 2000 to March 2001.

In 2000, The Legend of the Gambler: Tetsuya won the 23rd Kodansha Manga Award in the shōnen category.

Plot
In 1944, Tetsuya Asada was 15 years old. Three years after the attack on Pearl Harbor, Tetsuya was mobilized to work at a munitions factory. One day, he was with one of his lunch break friends and was being taught how to gamble by his colleague's uncle. At that time, an old man who survived without escaping in the tragedy of an air raid that turns the whole area into a burnt field teaches him that "unlucky people die". The following year, Japan lost the war and was in a poor situation. Tetsuya, who managed to get a job, is gambling at his workplace and was driven to the last minute by losing consecutively, showed his talent as a gamer. After meeting Inami at a gambling hall, Tetsuya heads for Yokosuka after hearing that he can make money by playing mahjong against American soldiers in Yokosuka.

Media

Manga
Written by Fūmei Sai and illustrated by Yasushi Hoshino, Shōbushi Densetsu Tetsuya was serialized in Kodansha's Weekly Shōnen Magazine from July 30, 1997, to December 8, 2004. Kodansha compiled the series' individual chapters into 41 tankōbon volumes published from December 16, 1997, to February 17, 2005.

Anime
The manga was adapted into a 20-episode anime television series produced by Toei Animation and broadcast on TV Asahi from October 6, 2000 to March 23, 2001.

Reception
The Legend of the Gambler: Tetsuya won the 23rd Kodansha Manga Award for the shōnen category in 2000.

See also
Gambling in Japan

References

External links
 Official Anime website 
 

2000 anime television series debuts
Anime and manga about gambling
Kodansha manga
Mahjong in anime and manga
Shōnen manga
Toei Animation television
Winner of Kodansha Manga Award (Shōnen)